The fourth season of the American neo-Western television series Justified premiered on January 8, 2013, on FX, and concluded on April 2, 2013, consisting of 13 episodes. The series was developed by Graham Yost based on Elmore Leonard's novels Pronto and Riding the Rap and his short story "Fire in the Hole". Its main character is Raylan Givens, a deputy U.S. Marshal. Timothy Olyphant portrays Givens, a tough federal lawman, enforcing his own brand of justice in his Kentucky hometown. The series is set in the city of Lexington, Kentucky, and the hill country of eastern Kentucky, specifically in and around Harlan.

Plot
Season four is about a mystery, left unsolved for 30 years. On January 21, 1983, a man wearing a defective parachute plummets onto a residential street in Corbin, Kentucky, dying instantly. His body is surrounded by bags full of cocaine and his name is Drew Thompson. Raylan discovers a mystery when a vintage diplomatic bag is found hidden at Arlo's house containing only a driver's license in the name of Waldo Truth. Further investigation reveals that the parachutist was actually Waldo Truth and that Drew Thompson is still alive, however Arlo refuses to divulge any information. As the investigation continues to unfold, it's revealed that Drew Thompson witnessed Theo Tonin committing murder meaning he could take down the Detroit Mob. Raylan is now living above a bar and attempting to stash extra money away to provide for his unborn child and is in a questionable relationship with the bartender, Lindsey Salazar. Meanwhile, Boyd Crowder seeks to expand his empire with help from an old army buddy Colton "Colt" Rhodes (Ron Eldard). However, his efforts are complicated by the arrival of a snake-handling revival preacher named Billy St. Cyr (Joe Mazzello) and his sister Cassie (Lindsay Pulsipher) who is willing to do anything for her brother. Billy's success is cutting into Boyd's profits, as his users and dealers are getting hooked on faith instead of drugs. Wynn Duffy is ordered by the Detroit Mob to find Thompson and in turn he offers Boyd a partnership in the heroin trade which leads to a showdown between Crowder's gang and the Marshals. At the same time, cousin Johnny (David Meunier) grows ever more resentful of Boyd's success and plans to betray him by promising Duffy he'd find Thompson himself. Boyd, after proposing to Ava, is brought to an unexpected crossroads that threatens his personal or professional destruction. A Detroit Mob enforcer makes a bold move against Raylan forcing Raylan to find out how far he'd go to protect his family. Other stories include Shelby Parlow distancing himself from Boyd and protecting Ellen May, a prostitute, from Ava's growing violent tendencies.

Cast and characters

Main
 Timothy Olyphant as Deputy U.S. Marshal Raylan Givens
 Nick Searcy as Chief Deputy U.S. Marshal Art Mullen
 Joelle Carter as Ava Crowder
 Jacob Pitts as Deputy U.S. Marshal Tim Gutterson
 Erica Tazel as Deputy U.S. Marshal Rachel Brooks
 Walton Goggins as Boyd Crowder

Recurring

Guest
 David Andrews as Tillman Napier
 Max Perlich as Sammy Tonin
 Stephen Tobolowsky as FBI Agent Jeremy Barkley

Production
The fourth season of 13 episodes was announced on March 6, 2012.

Filming
Episodes were shot in California. The small town of Green Valley, California often doubles for Harlan, Kentucky.

Episodes

Reception
On Rotten Tomatoes, the season has an approval rating of 100% with an average score of 9.5 out of 10 based on 25 reviews. The website's critical consensus reads, "Bolstered by witty, efficient dialogue and confident storytelling, Justified makes a strong case for consideration among cable television's top dramas." On Metacritic, the season has a weighted average score of 90 out of 100, based on 14 critics, indicating "universal acclaim.

Tom Gliatto of People Weekly praised this season, writing: "What gives the show its kick is the gleefully childish lack of repentance shown by most of these rascals—countered by Olyphant's coolly amused control." Verne Gay  of Newsday praised this season also, writing: "Character—as the old saying goes—is a long-standing habit, and their habits remain very much intact. The same could be said of Justified.", and Chuck Bowen of Slant Magazine praised this season, writing: "Justified is the strongest, liveliest, and most tonally accurate adaptation of the writer's work to date, and the latest season bracingly suggests that isn't likely to change anytime soon."

Ratings
The fourth season averaged 2.434 million viewers and a 0.9 rating in the 18–49 demographic.

Home media release
The fourth season was released on Blu-ray and DVD in region 1 on December 17, 2013, in region 2 on August 12, 2013, and in region 4 on August 8, 2013. Special features on the season four set include ten audio commentaries by cast and crew, deleted scenes, five behind-the-scenes featurettes, and outtakes.

References

External links

 

04
2013 American television seasons